Hetty Sorrel is a major character in George Eliot's novel Adam Bede (1859).

Beautiful but thoughtless Hetty lives in the fictional community of Hayslope — a rural, pastoral and close-knit community in 1799. Her home is on Mr. Martin Poyser's dairy farm as she is his niece. Because she is an extremely pretty girl, she is admired by Mr. Craig, Adam Bede as well as Captain Arthur Donnithorne. 

Aside from her great physical beauty, George Eliot takes care to make it clear that she does not have many attractive personal qualities. She is spoiled, cold, insensitive, indifferent to other people's problems, and almost comically vain and selfish. Even in love Hetty is relentless in her capacity to use others for her own gain. At first she is devoted to Arthur then after she realizes he will not make her a "great lady" she turns her affections to Adam. 

Hetty is a cousin by marriage of Dinah Morris, a fervent Methodist lay preacher. In contrast to Hetty, Dinah is depicted as completely pure, generous, unselfish, modest, and unfailingly compassionate. Both female characters are two-dimensional. Their stories are interesting yet one is completely good and the other is completely despicable. Dinah has no negative qualities and Hetty has no good qualities, making the characters superficial. At the end of the novel Hetty becomes more human-like and Eliot treats her with more compassion through her suffering.

Story
The novel revolves around a love triangle between vain and pleasure-loving Hetty Sorrel, Captain Arthur Donnithorne the young squire who seduces her, and Adam Bede her unacknowledged suitor. Although she is indifferent to good, stalwart Adam Bede, he is in love with Hetty. She is only a milkmaid yet she longs for the luxurious life of an upper class lady. In the 1700 - 1800s, marriage was approved within the same socioeconomic classes. In this respect, Hetty's desire to marry into wealth is extremely naive and almost comical. Being young and inexperienced she believes she is destined to this life due to her physical beauty. 

Hetty is attracted to Captain Donnithorne mostly because he is a rich man. He abuses his power to seduce Hetty into a sexual affair and she appears to fall in love with him. Although Eliot insists that Arthur is overall a good, conscionable man, his seduction of Hetty is selfish and degrading. He knows he will never marry her and he compromises her reputation with their tryst. 

Adam interrupts a meeting between them in the Chase and he is devastated. The two men fight and Adam insists Arthur write Hetty a letter before he returns to the militia informing her that their relationship is over. Broken-hearted and secretly pregnant, Hetty agrees to marry Adam to improve her situation. Before they wed however she abandons Adam and runs away in search of Arthur. She makes a long and arduous journey to Windsor only to discover the militia has moved to Ireland. Unwlling to return to the village and shame her family, Hetty considers suicide by drowning herself in an icy cold pond. She loses her nerve and delivers her baby in an inn. She kills the child by abandoning him in a field where he dies of exposure.

Hetty is caught and tried for child murder. Adam is devastated yet he blames Arthur and forgives Hetty. She is found guilty and sentenced to hang. When Arthur takes a leave from the militia to attend his grandfather's funeral, he hears of Hetty's impending execution. He races to the court and has her sentence commuted to penal transportation to Australia for the rest of her life. In the end Hetty is permitted to return to Australia after serving eight years of her sentence but dies before she reaches England.

According to The Oxford Companion to English Literature (1967), 
"the plot [of Adam Bede] is founded on a story told to George Eliot by her aunt Elizabeth Evans, a Methodist preacher and the original of Dinah Morris of the novel, of a confession of child-murder, made to her by a woman named Mary Voce in prison." 

Voce was a married woman whose husband Thomas was in the militia. When he was away, she became pregnant by another man and killed the child so her husband wouldn't discover her disloyalty. 

March 16, 1802, Mary Voce was a 24-year-old beautiful woman whose parents were unmarried. Like Hetty, they died when she was young and she was raised by relatives. She married Thomas Voce, an abusive man and they frequently separated and reunited. A neighbour stated Voce was abusive because of Mary's excessive extra-marital affairs. 

When Voce was away in the army, Mary gave birth to Elizabeth Voce, another man's child. The man abandoned her. For a time Mary had also turned to prostitution to support herself. Voce killed Elizabeth with arsenic in water to prevent Thomas from finding out about the baby. When she was arrested she blamed the neighbourhood children for feeding the arsenic to the child.  

Until her last moments, Mary Voce professed her innocence. Encouraged by lay preachers, she admitted to killing her baby and asking God for forgiveness. On the day of her hanging she accepted her fate with serenity and helped the exectioner to place the ropes around her neck. Voce was hung for an hour and her remains were publicly displayed. She was sister-in-law to a man named William who himself was hanged in 1775.

References

 The Oxford Companion to English Literature (1967)

George Eliot characters